Two-time defending champion Andre Agassi defeated Carlos Moyá in the final, 6–3, 6–3 to win the men's singles tennis title at the 2003 Miami Open.

Seeds
All thirty-two seeds received a bye to the second round.

Draw

Finals

Top half

Section 1

Section 2

Section 3

Section 4

Bottom half

Section 5

Section 6

Section 7

Section 8

External links
 Main draw

2003 NASDAQ-100 Open
NASDAQ-100 Open - Men's Singles